Neoterebra petiveriana is a species of sea snail, a marine gastropod mollusk in the family Terebridae, the auger snails.

Description

Distribution
Neoterebra petiveriana can be found within the Caribbean Sea, as well as some areas of Colombia.

References

External links
 Fedosov, A. E.; Malcolm, G.; Terryn, Y.; Gorson, J.; Modica, M. V.; Holford, M.; Puillandre, N. (2020). Phylogenetic classification of the family Terebridae (Neogastropoda: Conoidea). Journal of Molluscan Studies

Terebridae
Gastropods described in 1857